Ladislav Bezák (1932-2018) was a Czechoslovak aerobatic pilot, the first winner of the FAI World Aerobatic Championships in 1960, and first to win the Biancotto Trophy in 1965. In 1971, he defected by flying to West Germany. He loaded his wife and four sons into a two-seat Zlín Z 226 that took off in Prague and landed in Nuremberg, where all six were granted political asylum by West Germany. Ladislav Bezák died of natural causes at age 86 in his home in Bühne, Germany.

Sporting career
He is famous for performing the Lomcovák acrobatic maneuver for the first time.

See also 
 Competition aerobatics

References 

 Ladislav Bezak, revista Quick exklusiv
 Ladislav Bezak, the flying uncle, Nathalie Delcroix
 International sporting career, germanaerobatics.com
 Web site

External links 
 Le plus grandexploit du champion du monde d'acrobatie ap.rienne Paris-Match-Web
 Měl jsem proti sobě vrahy
 www.piloti.snadno.eu/Letecke-pribehy.html
 

Aerobatic pilots
Czech aviators
Living people
Czechoslovak defectors
1932 births